Klimeschia is a genus of moths in the family Douglasiidae. It is found in the Palearctic realm.

Species
 Klimeschia afghanica Gaedike, 1974
 Klimeschia lutumella Amsel, 1938
 Klimeschia paghmanella Gaedike, 1974
 Klimeschia thymetella (Staudinger, 1859)
 Klimeschia transversella (Zeller, 1839)
 Klimeschia vibratoriella (Mann, 1862)

References

Douglasiidae
Gracillarioidea genera